Lin Shllaku (12 July 1938 - 8 August 2016) was an Albanian footballer who played for Vllaznia Shkodër and Partizani Tirana, as well as the Albania national team.

Playing career

Club
Born in Shkodër, Shllaku started with local club Vllaznia but played the largest part of his career for army club Partizani, with whom he won 7 league titles. He also won 7 domestic cups and was Partizani and national team captain for 7 years.

International
He made his debut for Albania in a June 1963 Olympic Games qualification match against Bulgaria and earned a total of 15 caps, scoring no goals. His final international was an October 1970 European Championship qualification away against Poland.

Managerial career
After retiring as a player, he became an assistant at Partizani before being named coach of Besëlidhja.

Personal life
After the fall of communism, Shllaku lived in Kavala, Greece for 12 years.

Death
He died of a lung disease on 8 August 2016 at the Shefqet Ndroqi Hospital.

Honours
Albanian Superliga: 7
 1957, 1958, 1959, 1961, 1963, 1964, 1971

References

External links

1938 births
2016 deaths
Footballers from Shkodër
Albanian footballers
Association football midfielders
Albania international footballers
KF Vllaznia Shkodër players
FK Partizani Tirana players
Kategoria Superiore players
Albanian football managers
Besëlidhja Lezhë managers
Kategoria Superiore managers